All Through the Night is an oil painting by Antanas Žmuidzinavičius, from 1906.

Description
The painting has dimensions 84 cm x 110 cm.
It is in the collection of Lithuanian Art Museum.

Analysis

The painting is from the artist's early period.
The composition is simple. 
It shows a table, a lamp, and a window with the sky beginning to lighten outside. 
The painting is in the realist style.

References

1906 paintings
Lithuanian paintings